CIHS may refer to:

 CIHS-FM, a radio station in Wetaskiwin, Alberta, Canada
 Cambridge-Isanti High School, Cambridge, Minnesota, United States
 Channel Islands High School, Oxnard, California, United States